Matavesi is a surname. Notable people with the surname include:

Josh Matavesi (born 1990), Cornish rugby union player
Sam Matavesi (born 1992), Fijian rugby union player